The 2012 Indonesia Super League U-21 season was the fourth edition of Indonesia Super League U-21 (ISL U-21), a companion competition Indonesian super league that are intended for footballers under the age of twenty-one years.

Persela U-21 is the defending champion in this season.

Format 
The competition is divided into three acts consist of two round the group and knockout round. The first round is divided into five groups each containing four and three clubs, two top teams of each group advanced to the second round. The second half consisted of two groups containing five teams in each group intended, the two best teams from each group advanced to the semifinals. The winner advanced to the final, while two teams who defeated third-ranked fight. Final winner becomes the champion.

Teams

Promotion and relegation 
Teams promoted to ISL U-21
 Gresik United U-21
 Mitra Kukar FC U-21
 Persiba Bantul U-21
 Persidafon U-21
 Persiraja U-21
 Persita U-21
 PSAP Sigli U-21
 PSMS Medan U-21

Teams relegated
 Bontang FC U-21
 PSM Makassar U-21
 Persema U-21 
 Persibo U-21

Personnel and kits

Note: Flags indicate national team as has been defined under FIFA eligibility rules. Players and Managers may hold more than one non-FIFA nationality.

Group stage 
Round I of group stage started 2 April 2012 to ended on 25 April 2012 and round II started 9 May 2012 to ended on 24 May 2012.

Persijap Jepara U-21, Semen Padang U-21 (Previous Runner-up), Persiba Bantul U-21 and Persiraja U-21 withdrawn after the main team of the four U-21 team was withdrawn from Indonesia Super League and played in Indonesia Premier League.

Group A
All matches were played in Krakatau Steel Stadium, Cilegon (round I) and in Jakabaring Stadium, Palembang (round II).

Group B
All matches were played in Kanjuruhan Stadium, Malang Regency (round I) and in Gelora Delta Stadium, Sidoarjo (round II).

Group C
All matches were played in Persiba Stadium, Balikpapan (round I) and in Segiri Stadium, Samarinda (round II).

Group D
All matches were played in Teladan Stadium, Medan (round I) and in GOR Ciracas Stadium, Jakarta (round II).

Group E
All matches were played in Mandala Stadium, Jayapura

Updated to games played on 24 May 2012.
Source: ISL U-21 ReviewISL U-21 Table
1 = Persidafon U-21 walkover win over Persiwa U-21
2 = Persipura U-21 walkover win over Persiwa U-21
3 = Persiram U-21 walkover win over Persiwa U-21
4 = Persiwa U-21 were deducted 9 points due to three times was not present at the stadium in the face of Persidafon U-21, Persipura U-21 and Persiram U-21
Rules for classification: 1st points; 2nd goal difference; 3rd number of goals scored.
(C) = Champion; (R) = Relegated; (P) = Promoted; (O) = Play-off winner; (A) = Advances to a further round.
Only applicable when the season is not finished:
(Q) = Qualified to the phase of tournament indicated; (TQ) = Qualified to tournament, but not yet to the particular phase indicated; (DQ) = Disqualified from tournament.

Second stage
This stage started after drawing in opening June 2012. Start on 16 June to end on 23 June 2012.

Group I
All matches were played in Surajaya Stadium, Lamongan.

Group II
All matches were played in Mandala Stadium, Jayapura.

Updated to games played on 23 June 2012.
Source: ISL U-21 ReviewISL U-21 Table
Rules for classification: 1st points; 2nd goal difference; 3rd number of goals scored.
(C) = Champion; (R) = Relegated; (P) = Promoted; (O) = Play-off winner; (A) = Advances to a further round.
Only applicable when the season is not finished:
(Q) = Qualified to the phase of tournament indicated; (TQ) = Qualified to tournament, but not yet to the particular phase indicated; (DQ) = Disqualified from tournament.

Knockout stage

Semi-finals

Third-placed

Final

Season statistic

Top goalscorers
Including matches played on 1 July 2012

Own goals

Hat-tricks

Scoring
First goal of the season: Sukron Makmun for Persita U-21 against Sriwijaya U-21 (2 April 2012)
Fastest goal of the season: 55 second – Moch. Bahrudin for Deltras U-21 against Gresik United U-21 (13 May 2012)
Widest winning margin: 8 goals
Mitra Kukar U-21 0–8 Persisam Putra U-21 (9 May 2012)
Highest scoring game: 8 goals
Persipura U-21 4–4 Persiram U-21 (21 April 2012)
Mitra Kukar U-21 0–8 Persisam Putra U-21 (9 May 2012)
Persipura U-21 7–1 Persidafon U-21 (16 June 2012)
Pelita Jaya U-21 7–1 Persipura U-21 (1 July 2012)
Most goals scored in a match by a single team: 8 goals
Mitra Kukar U-21 0–8 Persisam Putra U-21 (9 May 2012)
Most goals scored in a match by a losing team: 2 goals
Persita U-21 3–2 Pelita Jaya U-21 (9 April 2012)
Persiba U-21 3–2 Mitra Kukar U-21 (11 May 2012)
Persija Jakarta U-21 3–2 Persita U-21 (17 June 2012)
Persela U-21 3–2 Persita U-21 (21 June 2012)
Persidafon U-21 2–5 Persisam Putra U-21 (21 June 2012)
Persipura U-21 4–2 Persiba U-21 (21 June 2012)
Widest away winning margin: 8 goals
Mitra Kukar U-21 0–8 Persisam Putra U-21 (9 May 2012)
Most goals scored by an away team: 8 goals
Mitra Kukar U-21 0–8 Persisam Putra U-21 (9 May 2012)

Clean sheets
Most Clean Sheets: 6
Persela U-21
Fewest clean sheets: 1
Arema U-21
Deltras U-21
Gresik United U-21
Mitra Kukar U-21
Persib U-21
Persiba U-21
Persiwa U-21
Sriwijaya U-21

See also
2011-12 Indonesia Super League
2011-12 Liga Indonesia Premier Division (LI)

References

External links
Indonesia Super League standings (including U-21 ISL)

 
2012
U21